Kyūjitai are the traditional forms of kanji (Chinese written characters used in Japanese writing). Their simplified counterparts are shinjitai. Some of the simplified characters arose centuries ago and were in everyday use in both China and Japan, but they were considered inelegant, even uncouth. After World War II, simplified character forms were made official in both these countries.

However, in Japan fewer and less drastic simplifications were made. The traditional form also continues to be used in Hong Kong, Macau, South Korea and Taiwan, which continue to use traditional Chinese characters, 

Prior to the promulgation of the tōyō kanji list in 1946, kyūjitai were known as seiji or seijitai. Even after kyūjitai were officially marked for discontinuation with the promulgation of the tōyō kanji list, they were used in print frequently into the 1950s due to logistical delays in changing over typesetting equipment. Kyūjitai continue in use to the present day because when the Japanese government adopted the simplified forms, it did not ban the traditional forms. Thus, traditional forms are used when an author wishes to use them and the publisher agrees.

Unlike in the People's Republic of China, where all personal names were simplified as part of the character simplification reform carried out in the 1950s, the Japanese reform only applied to a subset of the characters in use (the tōyō kanji) and excluded characters used in proper names. Therefore, kyūjitai are still used in personal names in Japan today (see jinmeiyō kanji). In modern Japanese, kyūjitai that appear in the official spelling of proper names are sometimes replaced with the modern shinjitai form.

Jōyō kanji

In the 2,136 , there are 364 pairs of simplified and traditional characters (for example,  is the simplified form of ). Note that the kanji  is used to simplify three different traditional kanji (and ).

Traditional characters that may cause problems displaying
Note that within the jōyō kanji there are 62 characters the old forms of which may cause problems displaying:

Kyōiku kanji (26):

 Grade 2 (2 kanji): 
 Grade 3 (8 kanji): 
 Grade 4 (6 kanji): 
 Grade 5 (1 kanji): 
 Grade 6 (9 kanji): 

Secondary-school kanji (36):

 Secondary school (36 kanji): 

These characters are Unicode CJK Unified Ideographs for which the old form (kyūjitai) and the new form (shinjitai) have been unified under the Unicode standard. Although the old and new forms are distinguished under the JIS X 0213 standard, the old forms map to Unicode CJK Compatibility Ideographs which are considered by Unicode to be canonically equivalent to the new forms and may not be distinguished by user agents. Therefore, depending on the user environment, it may not be possible to see the distinction between old and new forms of the characters. In particular, all Unicode normalization methods merge the old characters with the new ones.

List of the simplified jōyō kanji and their traditional forms

In the revised version of jōyō kanji, 5 kanji were removed (but preserved as jinmeiyō kanji), and 196 more kanji were added into Jōyō Kanjihyō of originally 1945 kanji; 6 of these new kanji have a traditional and a simplified form. They are underlined in the following list.

Jinmeiyō Kanji

Kyūjitai vs. Shinjitai 

The Jinmeiyō Kanji List contains 212 traditional characters still used in names.
The modern form (shinjitai), which appears in the Jōyō Kanji List, is given in parentheses.

Variants 

The Jinmeiyō Kanji List also contains 631 additional kanji that are not elements of the Jōyō Kanji List; 18 of them have a variant:

Former jōyō kanji still used as jinmeiyō kanji 

The following 5 kanji were removed from the Jōyō Kanji List in 2010, but were preserved as jinmeiyō kanji. They have no simplified form.
勺　銑　脹　錘　匁

Jinmeiyō kanji used as jōyō kanji since 2010 

Of the 196 new jōyō kanji, 129 were already on the Jinmeiyō Kanji List; 10 of them are used in names of Japanese prefectures, and the kanji  that appears in the name of South Korea ( Kankoku).
Four of these kanji have both a simplified and a traditional form:

艶（豔） 曽（曾） 痩（瘦） 弥（彌）

Hyōgai kanji 

Hyōgai kanji are kanji that are elements of neither the Jōyō Kanji List nor the Jinmeiyō Kanji List.
In , traditional characters are recognized as printed standard style  while the simplified characters are recognized as simple conventional style.
Here are some examples of hyōgai kanji that have a simplified and a traditional form:

Former Hyōgai Kanji used as Jōyō Kanji since 2010 

In 2010, 67 hyōgai kanji were added to the Jōyō Kanji List; 2 of them have a traditional and a simplified form:

餅（餠） 麺（麵）

Kokuji 

Kokuji are characters that were created in Japan and were not taken over from China. Some of them, e.g. , are now also used in Chinese, but most of them are not.

Currently, there are no kokuji that have been simplified after their introduction.

Kokuji used as Jōyō Kanji or Jinmeiyō Kanji (as of 2010)

働　匂　塀　峠　腺　枠　栃　畑　込

 was removed from the Jōyō Kanji List in 2010, but is still used as jinmeiyō kanji.

The Jinmeiyō Kanji List currently contains 16 kokuji:
匁　俣　凧　凪　喰　柾　椛　榊　樫　畠　笹　籾　辻　雫　鰯　麿

See also
Traditional Chinese characters

References

External links

 A complex Shinjitai - Kyūjitai converter

Japanese writing system terms

ja:字体#旧字体